Damle is a surname. Notable people with the surname include:

Prashant Damle (born 1961), Indian actor and comedian
Satyawan Damle (born 1951), Indian professor
Shivrampant Damle (1900–1977), Indian educationist
Sitaram Keshav Damle, Marathi journalist
Vishnupant Govind Damle (1892–1945), Indian production designer, cinematographer, film director, and sound engineer

Indian surnames
Marathi-language surnames